The Janapadas (c. 1500–600 BCE) were the realms, republics (ganapada) and kingdoms (sāmarājya) of the Vedic period on the Indian subcontinent. The Vedic period reaches from the late Bronze Age into the Iron Age: from about 1500 BCE to the 6th century BCE. With the rise of sixteen Mahajanapadas ("great janapadas"), most of the states were annexed by more powerful neighbours, although some remained independent.

Etymology 
The Sanskrit term janapada is a tatpurusha compound term, composed of two words: janas and pada. Jana means "people" or "subject" (cf. Latin cognate genus, English cognate kin). The word pada means "foot" (cf. Latin cognate pedis); from its earliest attestation, the word has had a double meaning of "realm, territory" and "subject population" (cf. Hittite pedan, "place"). Linguist George Dunkel compares the Greek andrapodon "slave", to PIE  "fetters" (i.e. "what is attached to the feet"). Sanskrit padám, usually taken to mean "footprint, trail", diverges in accent from the PIE reconstruction.
For the sense of "population of the land", padasya janas, the inverted padajana would be expected. A primary meaning of "place of the people", janasya padam, would not explain why the compound is of masculine gender. An original dvandva "land and people" is conceivable, but a dual inflection would be expected.

Evolution 

Literary evidence suggests that the janapadas flourished between 1500 BCE and 500 BCE. The earliest mention of the term "janapada" occurs in the Aitareya (8.14.4) and Shatapatha (13.4.2.17) Brahmana texts.

In the Vedic samhitas, the term jana denotes a tribe, whose members believed in a shared ancestry. The janas were headed by a king. The samiti was a common assembly of the jana members, and had the power to elect or dethrone the king. The sabha was a smaller assembly of wise elders, who advised the king.

The janas were originally semi-nomadic pastoral communities, but gradually came to be associated with specific territories as they became less mobile. Various kulas (clans) developed within the jana, each with its own chief. Gradually, the necessities of defence and warfare prompted the janas to form military groupings headed by janapadins (Kshatriya warriors). This model ultimately evolved into the establishment of political units known as the janapadas.

While some of the janas evolved into their own janapadas, others appear to have mixed together to form a common Janapada. According to the political scientist Sudama Misra, the name of the Panchala janapada suggests that it was a fusion of five (pancha) janas. Some janas (such as Aja and Mutiba) mentioned in the earliest texts do not find a mention in the later texts. Misra theorizes that these smaller janas were conquered by and assimilated into the larger janas.

Janapadas were gradually dissolved around 500 BCE. Their disestablishment can be attributed to the rise of imperial powers (such as Magadha) in Northern India, as well as foreign invasions (such as those by the Persians and the Greeks) in the north-western South Asia.

Nature 
The Janapada were highest political unit in Northern India during this period; these polities were usually monarchical (though some followed a form republicanism) and succession was hereditary. The head of a kingdom was called a (rajan) or king. A chief (purohita) or priest and a (senani) or commander of the army who would assist the king. There were also two other political bodies: the (sabha), thought to be a council of elders and the (samiti), a general assembly of the entire people.

The boundaries of the kingdoms
Often rivers formed the boundaries of two neighboring kingdoms, as was the case between the northern and southern Panchala and between the western (Pandava's Kingdom) and eastern (Kaurava's Kingdom) Kuru. Sometimes, large forests, which were larger than the kingdoms themselves, formed their boundaries as was the case of Naimisha Forest, the NaimishaAranyam between Panchala and Kosala kingdoms. Mountain ranges like Himalaya, Vindhyachal and Sahyadri also formed their boundaries.

The cities and villages

Some kingdoms possessed a main city that served as its capital. For example, the capital of Pandava's Kingdom was Indraprastha and the Kaurava's Kingdom was Hastinapura. Ahichatra was the capital of Northern Panchala whereas Kampilya was the capital of Southern Panchala. Kosala Kingdom had its capital at Ayodhya. Apart from the main city or capital, where the palace of the ruling king was situated, there were small towns and villages spread throughout the kingdom, from which tax was collected by officers appointed by the king.  What the king offered in return was protection from attack by other kings and robber tribes, as well as from invading foreign nomadic tribes. The king also enforced law and order in his kingdom by punishing the guilty.

Administration 

The Janapadas had Kshatriya rulers. Based on literary references, historians have theorized that the Janapadas were administered by the following assemblies in addition to the king:

 Sabha (Council)
 An assembly more akin to a council of qualified members or elders (mostly men) who advised the king and performed judicial functions. In the ganas or republican Janapadas called Gana-Rajya with no kings, the council of elders also handled administration.

 Paura Sabha (Executive Council)
 The Paura Sabha was the assembly of the capital city (pura), and handled municipal administration.

 Samiti (General Assembly)
 A samiti generally consisted of all adults of the republic or the city-state. A samiti was congregated when a matter of importance had to be communicated to the entire city-state. A samiti was also held at the time of festivals to plan, raise revenue and conduct the celebrations.
 
 Janapada
 The Janapada assembly represented the rest of the Janapada, possibly the villages, which were administered by a Gramini.

Some historians have also theorized that there was a common assembly called the "Paura-Janapada", but others such as Ram Sharan Sharma disagree with this theory. The existence of Paura and Janapada itself is a controversial matter.

Indian nationalist historians such as K. P. Jayaswal have argued that the existence of such assemblies is evidence of prevalence of democracy in ancient India. V. B. Misra notes that the contemporary society was divided into the four varnas (besides the outcastes), and the Kshatriya ruling class had all the political rights. Not all the citizens in a janapada had political rights. Based on Gautama's Dharmasutra, Jayaswal theorized that the low-caste shudras could be members of the Paura assembly. According to A. S. Altekar, this theory is based on a misunderstanding of the text: the term "Paura" in the relevant portion of the Dharmasutra refers to a resident of the city, not a member of the city assembly. Jayaswal also argued that the members of the supposed Paura-Janapada assembly acted as counselors to the king, and made other important decisions such as imposing taxes in times of emergency. Once again, Altekar argued that these conclusions are based on misinterpretations of the literary evidence. For example, Jayaswal has wrongly translated the word "amantra" in a Ramayana verse as "to offer advice"; it actually means "to bid farewell" in proper context.

Interactions between kingdoms

There was no border security for a kingdom and border disputes were very rare. One king might conduct a military campaign (often designated as Digvijaya meaning victory over all the directions) and defeat another king in a battle, lasting for a day. The defeated king would acknowledge the supremacy of the victorious king. The defeated king might sometimes be asked to give a tribute to the victorious king. Such tribute would be collected only once, not on a periodic basis. The defeated king, in most cases, would be free to rule his own kingdom, without maintaining any contact with the victorious king. There was no annexation of one kingdom by another. Often a military general conducted these campaigns on behalf of his king. A military campaign and tribute collection was often associated with a great sacrifice (like Rajasuya or Ashvamedha) conducted in the kingdom of the campaigning king. The defeated king also was invited to attend these sacrifice ceremonies, as a friend and ally.

New kingdoms
New kingdoms were formed when a major clan produced more than one King in a generation. The Kuru clan of Kings was very successful in governing throughout North India with their numerous kingdoms, which were formed after each successive generation. Similarly, the Yadava clan of kings formed numerous kingdoms in Central India.

Cultural differences 

Parts of western India were dominated by tribes who had a slightly different culture, considered non-Vedic by the mainstream Vedic culture prevailing in the Kuru and Panchala kingdoms. Similarly, there were some tribes in the eastern regions of India considered to be in this category. Tribes with non-Vedic culture — especially those of barbaric nature — were collectively termed as Mleccha. Very little was mentioned in the ancient Indian literature about the kingdoms to the North, beyond the Himalayas. China was mentioned as a kingdom known as Cina, often grouped with Mleccha kingdoms.

List of Janapadas

Vedic literature 
The Vedas mention five sub-divisions of ancient India:

 Udichya (Northern region)
 Prachya (Eastern region)
 Dakshina (Southern region)
 Pratichya (Western region)
 Madhya-desha (Central region)

The Vedic literature mentions the following janas or janapadas:

Puranic literature 
The Puranas mention seven sub-divisions of ancient India:

 Udichya (Northern region)
 Prachya (Eastern region)
 Dakshinapatha (Southern region)
 Aparanta (Western region)
 Madhya-desha (Central region)
 Parvata-shrayin (Himalayan region)
 Vindhya-prashtha (Vindhyan region)

According to research by political scientist Sudama Misra, the Puranic texts mention the following janapadas:

Sanskrit epics 
The Bhishma Parva of the Mahabharata mentions around 230 janapadas, while the Ramayana mentions only a few of these. Unlike the Puranas, the Mahabharata does not specify any geographical divisions of ancient India, but does support the classification of certain janapadas as southern or northern.

Buddhist canon 
The Buddhist canonical texts - Anguttara Nikaya,  Digha Nikaya, Chulla-Niddesa,  although with some differences between them, primarily refer to the following 16 mahajanapadas ("great janapadas"):

Jain text 
The Jain text Vyākhyāprajñapti or Bhagavati Sutra also mentions 16 important janapadas, but many names differ from the ones mentioned in the Buddhist texts.

 Accha
 Anga
 Avaha
 Bajji (Vajji or Vrijji)
 Banga (Vanga)
 Kasi (Kashi)
 Kochcha
 Kosala
 Ladha (Lata)
 Magadha
 Malavaka
 Malaya
 Moli (Malla)
 Padha
 Sambhuttara
 Vaccha (Vatsa)

See also
Rigvedic tribes
Bharata Khanda
History of India
Mahajanapadas
Middle kingdoms of India
Monarchy in ancient India
Indo-Aryan peoples
List of ancient Indo-Aryan peoples and tribes

References

Bibliography
 

 
Empires and kingdoms of India
History of India
Social groups of India
13th-century BC establishments in India
6th-century BC disestablishments in India
Lists of ancient Indo-European peoples and tribes